John Coates may refer to:

Entertainment
 John Coates (producer) (1927–2012), producer of The Snowman and other animated TV features
 John Coates (tenor) (1865–1941), English tenor
 John Coates Jr. (1938–2017), American jazz pianist

Sports
 John Coates (cricketer) (1828–1870), English cricketer
 John Coates (footballer) (born 1944), football goalkeeper
 John Coates (sports administrator) (born 1950), Australian solicitor, president of the Australian Olympic Committee

Others
 John H. Coates (1945–2022), Australian mathematician
 John Coates (naval architect) (1922–2010), British naval architect and historian
 John M. Coates, neuroscientist at the University of Cambridge
 John Coates (politician) (born 1944), Australian senator for Tasmania
 John Coates (general) (1932–2018), officer in the Australian Army
 John Coates (businessman) (born 1970), joint chief executive of online gambling company bet365 and joint chairman of Stoke City

See also
 John Coats (1906–1979), theosophist
 Jonathan Coates (born 1975), Welsh professional footballer
 John Coates Carter (1859–1927), English architect